The Arctic Playhouse is a non-profit theater in West Warwick, Rhode Island located at 1249 Main Street in the village of Arctic, Rhode Island.

History
The Arctic Playhouse evolved the ‘Daydream Theater Company’ that was founded in Providence, Rhode Island in 2002. In 2014, Daydream Theater Company was looking for a new, larger location.  A venue was secured in Arctic Village, West Warwick. This location, seating 90 patrons, became home to The Arctic Playhouse, (TAP) a 501(c)(3) nonprofit organization. The theater contributes to the revival of this formerly vibrant mill village and is theater as is should be.  

After demand for more space, TAP acquired the former Maxine's Department Store, (1249 Main Street) which will be the new home of The Arctic Playhouse, following a $1.5-million renovation that will give the theater company room to grow. “At the current location, the playhouse has 90 seats. At 1249 Main Street, it will have over 200 seats”, said board member Lloyd Felix.

The new facility plan is divided into a main theater with balcony seating and a cabaret stage for smaller, more intimate, audiences. Long time supporter Ida Zecco hosted the first Cabaret Club on April 30, 2019 with Jim Rice on piano and guest artist John Abernathy. Another regular supporting artist, Lon Cerel, followed on May 3 with his Thief of Thoughts performance.

During the COVID-19 Pandemic, performances were streamed live to keep the Arts alive, actors and  patrons involved and continued funding for renovations. 

September 23, 2021 marked TAP's first "in person" performance at 1249 Main Street - "Murder at the Howard Johnson's" directed by Tony Annicone, with patrons assembled in a modified area of 1249 which presently seats 96 people.

Future

Renovations continue for completing the theater with fundraising a vital part of this so equipment and materials can be purchased avoiding the need to finance into the future.

Seasons

- - - -

DRAFT - changes being made to update

2021-22 Season

2020-21 Season

- - - - -

2019-20 Season
Vintage Hitchcock (Joe Landry) dir. Diane Lupo  
Bermuda Avenue Triangle (Renee Taylor and Joseph Bologna) dir. Tony Annicone
Any Friend of Percy D'Angelino is A Friend of Mine (Jason Milligon) dir. Fred Davidson
The Gift of the Magi / Balls / The First Noel (O. Henry / George Cameron Grant) dir. Rachel Hanauer 
Seussical the Musical   
Who's Calling?
Visiting Mr. Green (Jeff Baron) dir. Sandy Cerel
All My Sons (Arthur Miller) dir. Tony Annicone

2018-19 Season
Steel Magnolias (Robert Harling) dir. Ida Zecco
All I Really Need to Know I Learned in Kindergarten - The Musical (Robert Fulghum and Ernie Zulia) dir. Diane Lupo
The Diary of Anne Frank (Frances Goodrich and Albert Hackett) dir. Rachel Hanauer
Breaking Legs (Tom Dulack) dir. Hen Zannini and Fred Davison
Who's Calling? (Rachel Hanauer) dir. Rachel Hanauer and Chelsea Swan
A Life in the Theatre (David Mamet) dir. Tony Annicone
A Christmas Carol the Musical (Charles Dickens) Original Score By Philip Martorella dir. John Martorella
Last of the Red Hot Lovers (Neil Simon) dir. Tony Annicone
Lost in Yonkers (Neil Simon) dir. Christian O'Brien

2017-18 Season
Alice in Wonderland (Lewis Carroll) dir. Rachel Hanauer
13 Rue de l'Amour (Georges Feydeau) dir. Christian O'Brien
MISGIVINGS: A “Divine” Comedy of Belly laughs, Blessings, Blarney & Bingo (Dave Kane) dir.  Dave Kane
TWO ONE ACT PLAYS! The Actor's Nightmare & Sister Mary Ignatius Explains It All For You (Christopher Durang) dir. Chris Plonka
A Christmas Carol – A Live Radio Play (Charles Dickens), Adapted by Kevin Connors, Joe Landry dir. Christian O'Brien  
I LOVE… WHAT’S HIS NAME? Directed and performed by Rachel Hanauer and the Newport Arts Collaborative
Tuesdays and Other Plays (William Donnelly) dir. William Donnelly
On Golden Pond (Ernest Thompson) dir. Sandy Cerel
The Odd Couple (Neil Simon) dir. John Faiola

2016-17 Season
Butterflies Are Free (Leonard Gershe) dir. Tony Annicone
The Dining Room (A. R. Gurney) dir. Sandy Cerel
Barry Weintraub: LEGACY (Lenny Schwartz) dir. Lenny Schwartz
Goodbye & Hurry Back (Lenny Schwartz) dir. Jennifer Rich
Mrs. Mannerly (Jeffrey Hatcher) dir. Mary Beth Luzitano
I Hate Hamlet (Paul Rudnick) dir. Christian O’Brien
Carol’s Christmas (Shannon McCloud) dir. Dave McCloud
Matt & Ben (Mindy Kaling and Brenda Withers)
Ben Minus Zoe Minus Ben (Lenny Schwartz) dir. Lenny Schwartz
Einstein & the Polar Bear (Tom Griffin) dir. Sandy Cerel

2015-16 Season
The Social Avenger (Lenny Schwartz) dir. Lenny Schwartz
Mac…Beth (Stephen Nani & Shannon McLoud) dir. Stephen Nani
My Husband’s Wild Desires (John Tobias) dir. John Faiola
Carol’s Christmas (Shannon McCloud) dir. Dave McCloud
Late, A Cowboy Song (Sarah Ruhl) dir. Kelli Noonan
Our Distance Between Stars (Lenny Schwartz) dir. Lenny Schwartz
Human Nature (Christopher Ferreira) dir. Christopher Ferreira

2014–15 Season
Crystal Romance (Lenny Schwartz) dir. Lenny Schwartz
Co-Creator (Lenny Schwartz) dir. Lenny Schwartz
The Man who Saw Snoopy (Lenny Schwartz) dir. Lenny Schwartz

References

Buildings and structures in West Warwick, Rhode Island
2014 establishments in Rhode Island
Theatres in Rhode Island
Tourist attractions in Rhode Island